Monte Cocuzzo is a mountain in the Catena Costiera in the Calabrian Apennines, in the province of Cosenza, southern Italy. It has an elevation of 1,541 m.

The name derives from the Latin Cacutium, in turn from the Greek κακός κύτος, meaning "bad stone" or "bad hole", referring to its alleged volcanic origin (shown also by its conical shape). Geologically, however, Monte Cocuzzo consists of sedimentary strata, mostly dolomite.

Mountains of Calabria
Mountains of the Apennines
One-thousanders of Italy